The 1976 USAC Championship Car season consisted of 13 races, beginning in Avondale, Arizona on March 14 and concluding at the same location on November 7.  The USAC National Champion was Gordon Johncock and the Indianapolis 500 winner was Johnny Rutherford.

Schedule and results
All races running on Oval/Speedway.

 Scheduled for 500 miles, stopped early due to rain.
 Scheduled for 200 miles, stopped early due to rain.

Final points standings

Note: David Hobbs, Danny Ongais and Vern Schuppan are not eligible for points.

References
 
 
 
 
 http://media.indycar.com/pdf/2011/IICS_2011_Historical_Record_Book_INT6.pdf  (p. 219-220)

See also
 1976 Indianapolis 500

USAC Championship Car season
USAC Championship Car
USAC Championship